The Tri-River Conference, established around 1965, was a seven-member IHSAA-sanctioned conference located within Clay, Greene, Morgan, and Sullivan counties in Indiana. It was named for the southern Eel, White, and Wabash rivers which flow through the territory of the conference.  Clay City, Linton Stockton, Shakamak, and Union (Dugger) high schools also participated in the Southwestern Indiana Conference at the same time. The conference disbanded at the end of the 2009-2010 school year.

Former members

 Played concurrently in the TRC and SWIAC 1992-2010.
 Played concurrently in the TRC and SWIAC 1968-2010.
 Played concurrently in the TRC and WIC throughout membership
 Played concurrently in the TRC and SWIAC 1974-2010. School was known as Dugger before 1965.
 Played concurrently in the TRC and SWIAC throughout membership.

Membership timeline

References

Resources
 IHSAA Conferences
 IHSAA Directory

Indiana high school athletic conferences
High school sports conferences and leagues in the United States
Indiana High School Athletic Association disestablished conferences